Gyula Zsengellér (27 December 1915 – 29 March 1999) was a Hungarian footballer who played as a striker. A legend of Újpest FC, he is most famous for his part in taking the Hungarian national team to the 1938 World Cup Final. He was that tournament's second-highest scorer, behind Leonidas of Brazil.

His first international cap came on 2 December 1936, when Hungary lost 6–2 against England. In total, he gained 39 caps for his country, scoring 33 goals. This makes him the eighth-highest goalscorer of all-time for the Hungarian national side.

Zsengellér also played 325 games in the Hungarian league and scored 387 goals between 1935 and 1947, making him the third-highest goalscorer of all-time in the Hungarian league. He began his career at Salgótarjáni TC, then moving to Újpest FC in 1936. Zsengellér spent 11 years serving Újpest, when in 1947 he joined Italian side A.S. Roma. In the 1949–50 season  Zsengellér played for Ancona and he finished his career playing for Colombian Deportivo Samarios between 1951 and 1952.

He was the Hungarian league's top-scorer in five seasons: 1938, 1939, 1943, 1944 and in the spring season of 1945. He was Europe's top goalscorer in 1939 and 1945.

After his retirement, Zsengellér started a long and successful managerial career, working mainly in Italy and Cyprus. He won the Cypriot First Division with Pezoporikos Larnaca in 1954 and the Cypriot Cup with APOEL FC in 1976. He died in 1999 aged 83.

IFFHS named Zsengellér the 7th most successful Top Division Goal Scorer of all time.

Career statistics

See also 
 List of men's footballers with 500 or more goals

References

External links
 IFFHS link

1915 births
1999 deaths
Hungarian people of German descent
Hungarian footballers
Serie A players
Categoría Primera A players
Újpest FC players
A.S. Roma players
A.C. Ancona players
Unión Magdalena footballers
Anorthosis Famagusta F.C. managers
Expatriate football managers in Cyprus
Expatriate footballers in Italy
Expatriate footballers in Colombia
1938 FIFA World Cup players
Hungary international footballers
Hungarian expatriate footballers
Hungarian expatriate sportspeople in Italy
APOEL FC managers
Apollon Pontou FC managers
Cyprus national football team managers
Hungarian football managers
Hungarian expatriate football managers
Association football forwards
Nea Salamis Famagusta FC managers
APOP Paphos FC managers
Pezoporikos Larnaca managers
Hungarian expatriate sportspeople in Colombia
Hungarian expatriate sportspeople in Cyprus
Hungarian expatriate sportspeople in Greece
People from Cegléd
Sportspeople from Pest County